The sultani was an Ottoman gold coin. The sultani is the classic Ottoman gold coin also known generically as altın ("gold").

References

Gold coins
Coins of the Ottoman Empire